Duilio Santagostino (April 15, 1914 in Turin – October 6, 1982 in Turin), was an Italian professional football player.

Honours
 Serie A champion: 1932/33.

1914 births
1982 deaths
Italian footballers
Serie A players
Juventus F.C. players
Association football midfielders
A.S.D. La Biellese players